Per August Leonard Hallström (29 September 1866 – 18 February 1960) was a Swedish author, short-story writer, dramatist, poet and member of the Swedish Academy. He joined the academy in 1908, and served as its Permanent Secretary from 1931 to 1941.

Life
Before devoting himself to writing, Hallström worked in London and Chicago as a chemist. He is appreciated primarily for his collections of short stories, such as Purpur [Purple] (1895) and Thanatos [Death] (1900). His major works, written before 1910, combine profound compassion with a sensitive awareness of beauty.
Between 1922 and 1946, Hallström served as Chairman of the Nobel Committee of the Swedish Academy for the Nobel Prize in Literature.

Per was grandfather to Anders Hallström, who was also a writer.

Selected short stories
"The Falcon" (April 1950), in Argosy, Australia/New Zealand edition

References

External links
Critical Essay by Per Hallström on Chlopi, winner of the 1924 Nobel Prize for literature

1866 births
1960 deaths
Writers from Stockholm
Swedish male writers
Swedish-language writers
Members of the Swedish Academy